Rousínov (until 1921 Nový Rousínov) is a town in Vyškov District in the South Moravian Region of the Czech Republic. It has about 5,600 inhabitants.

Administrative parts
Villages of Čechyně, Královopolské Vážany, Kroužek, Rousínovec, Slavíkovice and Vítovice are administrative parts of Rousínov.

Geography
It lies mostly in the Vyškov Gate, the southern part of the municipal territory lies in the Litenčice Hills. The small river Rakovec flows through the town.

History
The first written mention of Rousínov is from 1222. In 1321, it was last referred to as a village. It belonged to the Špilberk estate. It became an important crossroads of trade routes from Vienna and from Olomouc. Rousínov was a royal town until 1559, when Ferdinand I sold the Špilberk estate.

The Jewish community existed here from the second half of the 15th century until 1919. The business activities of the Jews after the Thirty Years' War brought economic prosperity to the town.

Until 1945, the village of Čechyně belonged to the German-speaking enclave called Vyškov Language Island. The area was colonized by German settlers in the second half of the 13th century. The coexistence of Czechs and Germans was mostly peaceful, which changed only after 1935, when many Germans tended to Nazism. In 1945, the German population was expelled.

Demographics

Transport
The D1 motorway goes around the town.

Rousínov lies on the railway line from Brno to Vyškov.

Notable people
Menahem Mendel Auerbach (1620–1689), Austrian rabbi, banker, and commentator; lived here
Josef Flesch (1781–1839), writer and translator
Nikolai Brashman (1796–1866), Russian mathematician
František Sušil (1804–1868), priest and folk music collector
Nehemiah Brüll (1843–1892), rabbi

Twin towns – sister cities

Rousínov is twinned with:
 Dervio, Italy
 Halásztelek, Hungary
 Podbranč, Slovakia

References

External links

Website about history of Rousínov Jews

Populated places in Vyškov District
Cities and towns in the Czech Republic
Shtetls
Jewish communities in the Czech Republic